Daichi Takatani (born 22 November 1994) is a Japanese freestyle wrestler. He won the silver medal in the 65 kg event at the 2018 Asian Games in Jakarta, Indonesia. In the same year, he also won the silver medal in the 65 kg event at the 2018 Asian Wrestling Championships held in Bishkek, Kyrgyzstan.

He competed in the 74kg event at the 2022 World Wrestling Championships held in Belgrade, Serbia.

Achievements

References

External links 
 

Living people
1994 births
Place of birth missing (living people)
Japanese male sport wrestlers
Asian Games medalists in wrestling
Wrestlers at the 2018 Asian Games
Medalists at the 2018 Asian Games
Asian Games silver medalists for Japan
Asian Wrestling Championships medalists
21st-century Japanese people